Man, Pride and Vengeance (is a 1967 Spaghetti Western film written and directed by Luigi Bazzoni and starring Franco Nero, Tina Aumont, and Klaus Kinski. It is a Western film adaptation of the novella Carmen by Prosper Mérimée, and is one of the few Westerns not only filmed, but also set in Europe.

Plot
When stalwart Spanish soldier Don José meets the stunningly beautiful Carmen, he becomes instantly obsessed with the mysterious gypsy woman. After discovering she has cheated on him with his Lieutenant, Jose kills the officer during a brawl and flees the city. Forced to become a bandit, Jose partners with Carmen's villainous husband Garcia to rob a stagecoach and prove his love for the seductive femme fatale.

Cast

 Franco Nero as Don José
 Tina Aumont as Carmen
 Klaus Kinsky as Lt. Miguel Garcia
 Lee Burton as Tanquiero
 Franco Ressel as Lt. Pepe
 Karl Schönböck as English Diplomat
 Alberto Dell'Acqua as Remendado
 Marcella Valeri as Dorotea
 Maria Mizar as Maria
 Mara Carisi as Nina
 José Manuel Martín as Juan
 Hans Albrecht as Miguel

Release
Man, Pride and Vengeance was released in December 1967. It was released in West Germany in 11 October 1968.

References

External links

1967 films
1967 Western (genre) films
West German films
1960s Italian-language films
Spaghetti Western films
Films based on Carmen
Films directed by Luigi Bazzoni
Films scored by Carlo Rustichelli
Films with screenplays by Suso Cecchi d'Amico
Films shot in Almería
Films about Romani people
1960s Italian films